Castronovo di Sicilia (Sicilian: Castrunovu) is a comune (municipality) in the Metropolitan City of Palermo in the Italian region Sicily, located about  southeast of Palermo.

References

External links
 Official website

Municipalities of the Metropolitan City of Palermo